Dasa Station (다사역) is a station of the Daegu Subway Line 2 in Maegok-ri, Dasa-eup, Dalseong County, Daegu, South Korea. The area surrounding this station is the downtown of the town Dasa-eup. Platform screen doors have been added to the subway platforms.

Notable places nearby
Dasa Elementary School
Dasa-eup Community Center
Public Health Center of Dasa
Dasa-eup Office
Dasa Area Patrol Unit
Dasa 119 Fire House
Dasa Middle School
Dasa High School
Dasa e-pyunhansesang apt

References

External links 
  Cyber station information from Daegu Metropolitan Transit Corporation

Daegu Metro stations
Dalseong County
Railway stations opened in 2005